Charles Guillaume Loys de Bochat (born 11 December 1695 in Lausanne, died 4 April 1754, also in Lausanne)  was an 18th-century  Swiss jurist and antiquarian (Lausanne at the time was a subject territory controlled by Berne).

He studied theology in Basle, which he interrupted for health reasons, and later changed his subject to law, in which he graduated in 1717. He became professor of law in Lausanne in 1718, but he was granted leave to travel for three years, which he spent in Halle, in Leyden and in France.

From 1721, he taught law at the Lausanne Academy, where he acted as rector from 1727 to 1730.
In 1738, he proposed to transform the academy into a full university, without success.

Loys de Bochat is best known for his major work, Mémoires critiques pour servir d'Eclaircissemens sur divers points de l'Histoire ancienne de la Suisse, which appeared in three volumes in 1747-1749.
This work is dedicated to examining the early history of Switzerland, especially the Gaulish Helvetii, and their legacy in Swiss toponymy.

Tomb
His tomb is in the ambulatory of the Lausanne Cathedral.

References

Ph. Meylan, Jean Barbeyrac (1674-1744) et les débuts de l'enseignement du droit dans l'ancienne Académie de Lausanne, 1937, 159-171.
F. Elsener, Die Schweizer Rechtsschulen vom 16. bis 19. Jahrhundert, unter besonderer Berücksichtigung des Privatrechts, 1975, 226-229.
J.-F. Poudret et al., L'enseignement du droit à l'Académie de Lausanne aux XVIIIe-XIXe s., 1987, 29-38.

Academic staff of the University of Lausanne
Swiss jurists
1695 births
1754 deaths